Felix A. Kremer (October 18, 1872 – January 11, 1940) was an American farmer, lawyer, newspaper publisher, and politician.

Born on a farm in Mount Carroll, Illinois, Kremer received his law degree from Northern Illinois University College of Law. From 1899 to 1916, Kremer practiced law in Madison, Wisconsin. He then moved to Phillips, Wisconsin, where he continued to practice law and owned a farm. Kremer served as district attorney and municipal judge for Price County, Wisconsin. He owned and published The Wisconsin Homestead, an agricultural newspaper. In 1937, Kremer served in the Wisconsin State Assembly and was a Progressive. Kremer died in a hospital in Madison, Wisconsin, in 1940.

References

1872 births
1940 deaths
People from Mount Carroll, Illinois
People from Phillips, Wisconsin
Politicians from Madison, Wisconsin
Northern Illinois University alumni
Wisconsin lawyers
Farmers from Wisconsin
Editors of Wisconsin newspapers
Wisconsin state court judges
Wisconsin Progressives (1924)
20th-century American politicians
Members of the Wisconsin State Assembly
Lawyers from Madison, Wisconsin